Mi México (English My Mexico) is the seventh studio album by Mexican pop singer Ana Gabriel. It was released in 1991. In this album, she left behind her usual pop genre and instead sang in ranchera and regional styles. By 2009, Mi México had sold 4.5 million copies worldwide.

Track listing
Tracks:
 Mi Talismán — 04:51
 ¿Cómo Olvidar? — 04:22
 No Entiendo — 03:45
 Oye — 03:16
 Y Aquí Estoy — 04:12
 Amigo Mío — 03:41
 Ahora — 03:23
 Sin Problemas — 03:33
 Hechizo — 03:29
 Voy A Ser — 04:06
 No Siempre Se Gana — 02:28

Singles
 Ahora reached #2 on Hot Latin Tracks.
 Sin Problemas reached #9 on Hot Latin Tracks.

Album charts
The album reached number one on the Billboard Regional Mexican Albums chart and number nine on the Billboard Top Latin Albums chart.

Sales and certifications

References

1991 albums
Ana Gabriel albums